The British Kinematograph, Sound and Television Society (BKSTS) is an organisation which serves the technical and craft skills of the film, sound and television industries. It was formed in 1931, originally named the British Kinematograph Society.

The BKSTS was founded in London, England in 1931 to serve the growing film industry. It organizes meetings, presentations, seminars, international exhibitions, conferences, and an extensive programme of training courses, lectures, workshops and special events. The BKSTS regularly publishes the magazines Image Technology and Cinema Technology.

The BKSTS has a graded membership scheme, which includes Full Membership for craft or technologically working professionals, Associate Membership for those with an interest in the industry, and Student Membership for anyone who is engaged in full-time study with intent to progress to a career in the Film and Television business. The BKSTS is represented through agents in Asia, Australia, Belgium, Canada, Egypt, France, India, Ireland, South Africa, Turkey and the USA. Its membership comes from all over the world.

The organisation relaunched as the International Moving Image Society in 2016 (See https://www.societyinmotion.com/tag/british-kinematograph-sound-and-television-society/ )

External links
 Official web site
 British Kinematography; Publisher: London, British Kinematograph Society at Internet Archive

Organizations established in 1931
Television organisations in the United Kingdom
Film organisations in the United Kingdom
1931 establishments in the United Kingdom